Dominic Joseph Mulrenan (December 18, 1893 – July 27, 1964) was a pitcher in Major League Baseball. He played for the Chicago White Sox.

References

External links

1893 births
1964 deaths
Major League Baseball pitchers
Chicago White Sox players
Baseball players from Massachusetts
People from Woburn, Massachusetts
Fitchburg Burghers players